Gim Eok-ryeom of the Gyeongju Gim clan (경주 김씨) was a nobleman and the Royal Family member of Late Kingdom of Unified Silla as the uncle of Gyeongsun of Silla. He was the father of Queen Sinseong, those make him become the fifth father in-law of Taejo of Goryeo, also the maternal grandfather of Anjong of Goryeo.

References

External links

Year of birth unknown
Year of death unknown
10th-century Korean people
Silla people